Aide-de-camp general is a senior honorary appointment for generals in the British Army. The recipient is appointed as an aide-de-camp general to the head of state, currently King Charles III. They are entitled to the post-nominals "ADC (Gen.)".

The Royal Air Force's equivalent appointment is air aide-de-camp, while the Royal Navy's is First and Principal Naval Aide-de-Camp.

List of aides-de-camp general

 † : Date of death.

References

Positions within the British Royal Household